The Sightseers Tram Car (commonly referred to as the Tramcar) is a trackless train service running on the Boardwalk in the Cape May County, New Jersey communities of Wildwood and North Wildwood. The service, which began on June 11, 1949, takes passengers along the two-mile long Wildwood Boardwalk. Service is available at all points along the boardwalk, from the beginning at Cresse Avenue to the end at 16th Avenue in North Wildwood.

Description

The Tramcar is colored yellow and blue, though sometimes contains other colors due to advertisements. It is well known for the phrase "Watch the tramcar, please," a pre-recorded alert voiced by local Floss Stingel in 1971 to clear the tramcar's path. The tramcar fare is $4.00. 

Operating hours are 11:00 a.m. to 1:00 a.m. The Tramcar started running five years after the boardwalk was made. The original fare was 10 cents one way. A round-trip tram-car ride takes approximately 1 hour. Each tram car runs on a 36-volt DC battery that weighs more than 2,000 pounds. The batteries are charged each night and can run for about seven or eight hours at a time. Several of the tramcars running on the Boardwalk are the same ones that were built for the 1939 New York World's Fair in New York City. The tramcars carry about half a million people up and down the Boardwalk each year. From 1998 to 2000, Wildwood hosted the annual Great Tramcar Race between entertainers Al Alberts and Cozy Morley.

In 2015, the tramcar’s famous “Watch the Tramcar please” phrase was used on the Atlantic City trams until a lawsuit was filed. This resulted in the trams receiving the new phrase, “Step aside or enjoy a ride”.

On August 9, 2019, the Runaway Tram steel roller coaster opened at Morey's Piers' Surfside Pier on the Wildwood Boardwalk and is modeled after the yellow-and-blue tramcar. On the caboose of the train is a figure in honor of long tenured tramcar driver, John "Gig" Gigliotti who has been driving the tramcars on the boardwalk for 25 years.

References

External links
Insightful Information about the history and impact of the Tramcar
More information
 Happy 60th Birthday, Tram Car!
Tram Cars Ease the Walk in Wildwood

The Wildwoods, New Jersey
Transportation in Cape May County, New Jersey